Jan-Michael Vincent (July 15, 1944 – February 10, 2019) was an American actor known for portraying helicopter pilot Stringfellow Hawke in the TV series Airwolf (1984–1987) and the protagonist, Matt Johnson, in the 1978 film Big Wednesday. He also starred as Byron Henry in The Winds of War.

Early life 
Jan-Michael Vincent was born in Denver, Colorado, where his father was stationed after enlisting in the United States Army in 1941. His father, Lloyd Whiteley Vincent (September 7, 1919 – August 30, 2000), was born in Tulare, California, and raised in nearby Hanford in the San Joaquin Valley. His mother, Doris Jane (née Pace; August 2, 1925 – February 22, 1993), was born in Arkansas and moved to Hanford as a toddler. Jan's grandfather, Herbert Vincent (September 26, 1876 – January 14, 1974), was a bank robber and counterfeiter who had masterminded robberies in the 1920s and 1930s. Jan's uncle, Lloyd's brother Hoy, was shot to death in Tulare by a sheriff's deputy and was wanted for a robbery that occurred in Oregon. Two of Vincent's other uncles, Clifford and Harold, were convicted of bank robbery in Hardwick, California and Strathmore, California in 1931. In 1932, Herbert and his son, Gordon, were arrested in Hanford in January for bank robbery and assault with a deadly weapon, which left Lloyd alone at age twelve.

Lloyd Vincent and Doris met in 1940 when she was 15 and Lloyd had finished high school. Lloyd was stationed in Denver in 1941 as a B-25 bomber pilot during World War II, and he married Doris there when she was sixteen. Jan's mistrust of authority came from later seeing his father in the Army being told what to do and when to do it. Jan Vincent's sister, Jaqueline "Jacquie" Vincent, was born in 1947. His brother, Christopher, was born in 1952. After the war, Lloyd became a painter, like Jan's grandfather, and later developed alcoholism. By the time Jan was born in 1944, his parents owned a sign company in Hanford.

Vincent attended school in Hanford and graduated in 1963 from Hanford High School. He attended Ventura College in Ventura, California, for three years and recalled, "I would have completed college, but the registration clerk literally shut the window in my face for the lunch hour", and Vincent instead took his $200 and went to Mexico to party. Years later, Vincent found himself in the same rigid system his father was in. He served in the California Army National Guard, and remained in the National Guard Reserve until 1971.

Career 
Vincent gained his first acting job in 1967 in The Bandits, starring and co-directed by Robert Conrad. Also in 1967, Vincent appeared in the TV movie The Hardy Boys: The Mystery of the Chinese Junk.

In the late 1960s, Vincent was signed to Universal Studios and appeared in several television series. He made an appearance in the Dragnet 1968 episode "The Grenade", as a muscular high school student who suffered an acid attack by a mentally unstable classmate (played by Mickey Sholdar). Vincent also appeared in the Danger Island segments of Hanna-Barbera's The Banana Splits series as Link (1968–1969). His first starring role was in the fall of 1969 in the prime-time soap opera The Survivors, alongside Lana Turner and George Hamilton; the series was canceled mid-season.

Vincent also acted in several movies in the late 1960s, including the 1969 20th Century Fox movie The Undefeated (as Bubba Wilkes), starring John Wayne, Rock Hudson, and Antonio Aguilar. His name appeared as Michael Vincent in the credits of the movie. Vincent guest-starred in three episodes of Lassie with actor Tony Dow and two episodes of Bonanza.

In 1970, Vincent garnered critical praise for his role in the TV movie Tribes (also known as The Soldier Who Declared Peace in Europe and the UK), co-starring Darren McGavin, about a tough Marine boot-camp drill instructor dealing with a hippie draftee (Vincent) who will not follow the rules. He gave a complex performance opposite Robert Mitchum in Going Home (1971). That same year, he appeared in the Gunsmoke episode "The Legend". In 1972, Vincent appeared with Charles Bronson in the crime film The Mechanic and a made-for-TV love story Sandcastles. In 1973, Vincent starred in the Disney comedy The World's Greatest Athlete, with Tim Conway and John Amos. Vincent played Richie, an alcoholic teen in the 1973 Marcus Welby, M.D. episode, "Catch a Ring That Isn't There". Also in 1973, he was in the made-for-TV-movie Deliver Us from Evil as Nick Fleming opposite George Kennedy.

Vincent also starred as the anti-hero Buster Lane in the 1974 romance Buster and Billie, wherein he startled audiences with his full-frontal nudity. In Bite the Bullet (1975), he played opposite Gene Hackman, James Coburn, and Candice Bergen. He also starred in the trucker movie White Line Fever (1975); in Baby Blue Marine (1976), a war film directed by John D. Hancock, which also starred Glynnis O'Connor; and in Shadow of the Hawk (1976) co-starring Marilyn Hassett. Vincent also starred in Damnation Alley (1977), based on Roger Zelazny's science fiction novel. Two more notable 1978 appearances were the surfing film Big Wednesday with William Katt and Gary Busey, and Hooper with Burt Reynolds, in which Vincent played a young stuntman.

In 1980, Vincent starred in the gang-themed drama Defiance, which received a limited release. In that film, he and Danny Aiello co-star as Manhattan residents who fight back against the gang members who terrorize their neighborhood. That year, Vincent appeared in The Return, a science-fiction film that was released directly to television and video. In 1981, he co-starred with Kim Basinger in Hard Country, and in 1983, he starred in the action film Last Plane Out.

After the completion of his role as Byron Henry ("Briny") in the 1983 television miniseries The Winds of War, Vincent was cast as Stringfellow Hawke for the action–espionage series Airwolf, in which he co-starred with Ernest Borgnine. It is the role for which he is best known and remembered. It was noted at the time that Vincent's salary for his work on Airwolf was $200,000 per episode, the highest of any actor in American television at the time. While filming Airwolf, Vincent admitted to having drug and alcohol problems for which he acknowledged seeking help. After Airwolf ended, he found roles in smaller budget and lower exposure film projects.

Vincent worked with Traci Lords in the 1991 suspense film Raw Nerve. He also co-starred with Clint Howard in the 1996 black comedy/horror film Ice Cream Man, which had a very limited theatrical release but eventually reached cult status via home video as an unintentional comedy. In 1994, he played in a South African produced movie called Ipi Tombi, produced and directed by Tommie Meyer based on a musical by Bertha Egnos.

While in the hospital in 1996, Vincent was committed to a role in Red Line with Chad McQueen as Keller. He appeared in the film with a swollen face and scars, and still wearing his hospital ID bracelet. In 1997, he had a small guest role on Nash Bridges, playing the title character's long-lost brother, and in 1998 he had a cameo role in the independent film Buffalo '66. His last role was in the independent film White Boy (titled Menace for the US video market), released in March 2003.

Personal life 
Vincent married Bonnie Poorman in 1968, and they had a daughter, Amber Spring Vincent, in 1973. The couple's divorce was finalized in 1986.

Vincent remarried in 1986. His second wife, Joanne Robinson, left him and entered a restraining order against him in 1998, alleging that he had abused her during their marriage.

He battled alcoholism and intravenous drug use for much of his life. In 1977, 1978, and 1979 he was arrested for possession of cocaine, and in 1984 and 1985 he was arrested after two bar brawls.

He was charged with felony assault in 1986, but was acquitted after his attorney argued that the woman tripped and fell on a telephone cord in his home. Vincent then was arrested for drunk driving but avoided jail by entering rehab in 1988. In 2000, a $374,000 default judgment was made against him after his former girlfriend alleged he had physically assaulted her after their breakup and caused her to miscarry their child.

During the 1990s, he was involved in three severe automobile collisions, which he barely survived. The first near-fatal accident occurred in February 1992. In the second accident, in August 1996, Vincent broke three vertebrae in his neck. He sustained a permanent injury to his vocal cords from an emergency medical procedure, leaving him with a permanently raspy voice.

Vincent was charged with drunk driving again after his 1996 accident, and once again sentenced to rehabilitation and placed on probation. In an interview on the television program The Insider on September 18, 2007, when asked about his 1996 car accident, Vincent answered "Y'know, I have no idea what you're talking about. I don't remember being in an accident."

In 2000, Vincent violated probation for his prior alcohol-related arrests by appearing drunk in public three times and assaulting his fiancée. As a result, he was sentenced to 60 days in the Orange County Jail. Vincent was involved in yet another automobile accident in 2008.

In an interview on October 24, 2014, with the National Enquirer, Vincent revealed that his right leg was amputated just below the knee in 2012 after he contracted a leg infection as a result of complications from peripheral artery disease. After that, he walked with a prosthetic limb, although he was sometimes forced to use a wheelchair.

Death 
Vincent died on February 10, 2019, at the age of 74 in Asheville, North Carolina, due to cardiac arrest while hospitalized at Mission Hospital. Bradycardia, a decreased heart rate, was listed as an underlying cause of death. His death was not publicly announced until March 8, when TMZ broke the news and showed a slightly redacted copy of Vincent's death certificate.

Filmography

Film

Television

References

Notes 

  In 1971, a TV movie titled The Last of the Powerseekers aired on ABC. Universal Television re-edited two of The Survivors episodes into the TV movie.
  In 1980, a TV movie titled Dan August: Once Is Never Enough aired on ABC. This was a re-editing of episode 15 "Death Chain" with episode 25 "Prognosis: Homicide".
  Jan-Michael Vincent: Edge of Greatness does not have page numbers. Use specific section of book for reference.

Citations

Further reading

External links 
 
 Whatever Happened To: Jan Michael Vincent

1944 births
2019 deaths
Age controversies
20th-century American male actors
21st-century American male actors
Actors with disabilities
American amputees
American male film actors
American male television actors
Male actors from California
Male actors from Denver
People from Hanford, California